Heondeok of Silla (died 826) (r. 809–826) was the 41st to rule the Korean kingdom of Silla.  He was the younger brother of King Soseong, and served as regent during the reign of Aejang.

In 790, Heondeok traveled to Tang China where he distinguished himself and received a high position.  He returned to Silla, becoming regent after the death of his brother.  In 809, he slew the now-adult Aejang and took the throne for himself.

In 810, Heondeok repaired the country's irrigation facilities.  He also sent his son Kim Heon-jang to Tang with gold and silver Buddhist images to pray for the emperor's eternal peace.

Heondeok's later reign saw the rebellion of Kim Heon-chang in 822, and that of Kim's son in the following year.  Both were suppressed.  In 824, troubled by threats from the north, the king ordered a 300-ri-long wall built near the Taedong River, which was then the country's northern border.

Family 
Grandfather: Wonseong of Silla
Grandmother: Queen Kim (Lady Yeonhwa)(숙정부인 김씨), of the Kim clan, the daughter of
Father: Prince Hyechung (혜충태자) (750–791/792), posthumously named King Hyechung (혜충왕)
Mother: Queen Seongmok, of the Kim clan ( 성목태후 김씨)
Wife:
Queen Gwiseun, of the Kim clan (귀승부인 김씨) daughter of Prince Ye–yeong (예영)
Unknown son

See also
Unified Silla
List of Korean monarchs
List of Silla people

References

Silla rulers
Silla Buddhists
Korean Buddhist monarchs
826 deaths
Year of birth unknown
9th-century Korean monarchs